The 1958 Australian Tourist Trophy was a 100-mile motor race for sports cars, staged at the Mount Panorama Circuit near Bathurst in New South Wales, Australia on 6 October 1958. It was the second in a sequence of annual Australian Tourist Trophy races, each of which was recognised by the Confederation of Australian Motor Sport as the Australian Championship for sports cars. The race was won by David McKay driving an Aston Martin DB3S.

Class Structure
Cars competed in six classes based on engine capacity:
 Up to 750cc
 751 to 1100cc
 1101 to 1500cc
 1501 to 2000cc
 2001 to 3000cc
 Over 3000cc

Results

Notes
 Attendance: 16,000
 Race distance: 26 laps, 100 miles
 Starters: 35
 Finishers: 22
 Winner's race time: 1 hour 19 minutes 21.9 seconds

References

External links
 Image of McKay (No 71 Aston Martin), Whiteford (No 7 Maserati) and Phillips (No 12 Cooper) at Bathurst in October 1958, aussieroadracing.homestead.com

Australian Tourist Trophy
Tourist Trophy
Motorsport in Bathurst, New South Wales